Dima Hani Al Kasti (born 13 December 2001) is a Lebanese footballer who plays as a left-back or left winger for Saudi Arabian club Al Hilal and the Lebanon national team.

Club career
Al Kasti joined Safa in 2019; she scored four goals and made six assists in 14 games in the 2019–20 season. On 5 September 2022, Al Kasti moved to reigning champions SAS. Only one month later, she moved to Al Hilal ahead of the 2022–23 Saudi Women's Premier League.

International career
On 30 August 2021, Al Kasti scored a brace for Lebanon in a 5–1 win against Sudan in the 2021 Arab Women's Cup. She was called up to represent Lebanon at the 2022 WAFF Women's Championship, helping her side finish runners-up.

Career statistics

International
Scores and results list Lebanon's goal tally first, score column indicates score after each Al Kasti goal.

Honours 
Safa
 WAFF Women's Clubs Championship: 2022
 Lebanese Women's Football League: 2020–21

Lebanon U18
 WAFF U-18 Women's Championship runner-up: 2018

Lebanon
 WAFF Women's Championship runner-up: 2022; third place: 2019

See also
 List of Lebanon women's international footballers

References

External links

 
 
 

2001 births
Living people
Footballers from Beirut
Lebanese women's footballers
Women's association football fullbacks
Women's association football wingers
Akhaa Ahli Aley FC (women) players
Safa WFC players
Stars Association for Sports players
Lebanese Women's Football League players
Lebanon women's youth international footballers
Lebanon women's international footballers
Lebanese expatriate women's footballers
Lebanese expatriate sportspeople in Saudi Arabia
Expatriate women's footballers in Saudi Arabia